Stapleford Tawney is a village and civil parish in the Epping Forest district of Essex, England.

History
Historically Stapleford Tawney was included in the hundred of Ongar.  It formed part of the Ongar Rural District Council from 1894 until that authority was absorbed into Epping and Ongar Rural District Council in 1955.  Following local government reorganisation in 1974 it became part of Epping Forest District.

Electricity was first connected to the parish in 1932 and most of the parish was supplied with water by the Herts and Essex Waterworks Co. in 1949.

Population
The parish was more populous in the past than at present.  The peak was in the Victorian period. 

The parish had a population of 103 in 2001, making it the least populated parish in the district.  The arithmetic population density is 15.4 per km2.

Geography
Its southern boundary is formed by the River Roding, while a stream flowing into it forms much of the parish's western boundary. The land rises quite steeply from below 30 metres where the Roding flows into Theydon Mount to above 90 metres in the extreme north, much of the parish being above the 60 metre contour. The parish covers an area of 670 hectares.

There is no strong focus of settlement in the parish except for the parish Church of St Mary on Tawney Lane which is within a small linear group of houses and farms. At the north of the parish,  from the parish church, are the hamlets of Colliers Hatch and Tawney Common.

Individual farms and houses are scattered throughout the parish. Land use is mostly agricultural. The M25 motorway cuts through the southern tip of the parish.

See also
Stapleford Abbotts
Collier's Hatch

References

External links

Villages in Essex
Civil parishes in Essex
Epping Forest District